Novodinia is a genus of echinoderms belonging to the family Brisingidae.

The genus has almost cosmopolitan distribution.

Species:

Novodinia americana 
Novodinia antillensis 
Novodinia austini 
Novodinia australis 
Novodinia clarki 
Novodinia homonyma 
Novodinia magister 
Novodinia novaezelandiae 
Novodinia pacifica 
Novodinia pandina 
Novodinia penichra 
Novodinia radiata 
Novodinia semicoronata

References

Brisingida
Asteroidea genera